Andrei Kononovich Suvorov (1887–1917) was an association football player.

International career
Suvorov played his only game for the Russia Empire on July 14, 1912, in a friendly against Hungary.

External links
  Profile

1887 births
1917 deaths
Footballers from the Russian Empire
Association football forwards
Russian military personnel killed in World War I